Kadayıf is a traditional Ottoman dessert. Several varieties exist, including tel kadayıf, yassı kadayıf and ekmek kadayıf.

Preparation
Kadayıf is made by pouring liquid wheat dough onto a rotating hot plate, after which sweeteners are added and the preparation is baked or fried. Kadayıf can also be used as the base for pudding, or prepared as noodles.

History
The exact origins of kadayıf are unknown. The Turkish Patent Institute states that the dish originated in Diyarbakır in the 19th century, but there is a rival claim of origin in Bingöl. According to oral tradition in Diyarbakır, the first kadayıf vendor in the city was an Armenian shop owner named Agop.

Varieties in Ottoman cuisine 
In the first Ottoman printed cookbook Melceü't-Tabbâhîn, various different kadayif recipes are given.

 Tel kadayıf
 Kadife, Kenîfe 
 Saray tel kadayıfı
 Beyaz kadayıf 
 Kaymaklı kadayıf
 Yassı kadayıf
 Yağsız kadayıf
 Yufkalı kadayıf 
 Ekmek kadayıfı (Şam Kahki) 
 Fodula kadayıfı
 Burma Kadayıf is a circular sweet pastry commonly made in Turkish cuisine. Instead of having layers of phyllo pastry, such as in baklava, it has shredded phyllo pastry called 'kadayıf' or 'kataifi'. 'Burma' is Turkish for 'twisting' and refers to how the noodle-shaped pastry is twisted around the nuts.

Taş kadayıf
Taş kadayıf(Stone kadayıf) is a Turkish dessert commonly served during the month of Ramadan,  a sort of sweet dumpling filled with  walnuts. Adana Taş Kadayıf; is porous. It is a dessert with syrup, which is folded in a circle of 9-10 cm and fried with walnuts in between. Adana Taş Kadayıf was registered by the Turkish Patent and Trademark Office on 06.01.2021 and received a geographical indication.

See also
Şekerpare
Revani
Baklava
Tulumba
List of Middle Eastern dishes
Knafeh

Gallery

References

Turkish desserts